Parasite is the debut studio album by See You Next Tuesday, it was released on April 3, 2007 on the indie label Ferret. It is also the first release by the band with vocalist Chris Fox. All the song titles (excluding "Paraphilia" and both parts of "Pogonotrophy") are quotes from movies and television shows.

Background

Recording
To prepare for the album, See You Next Tuesday booked three weeks studio time at Planet Red Studios. Eight days into the recording process the drums and guitars were completely finished, but a computer crash wiped all the data, which forced the band to essentially record the album from scratch a second time. The next two weeks of their booked studio time were spent re-recording and finishing the record.

Artwork
The artwork, layout and cover was done by Dutch artist Dennis Sibeijn, who has also done album cover artwork for Job for a Cowboy and Chimaira.

Track listing

Personnel
See You Next Tuesday
 Chris Fox − vocals
 Drew Slavik − guitars
 Travis Martin − bass
 Andy Dalton − drums
Production
 Produced, recorded and mixed by Andreas Magnusson

References

2007 debut albums
See You Next Tuesday albums
Ferret Music albums